Plea for Peace is the final EP by the American punk rock band Operation Ivy. It was released in February 1992, three years after they disbanded, through M&E Records. Plea for Peace contained four songs not featured on any of Operation Ivy's studio releases.

Production
The production of Plea for Peace was spearheaded by longtime fan and East Bay local Eric Yee. He approached various people for funds to produce a record of unreleased songs he had heard through Operation Ivy vocalist Jesse Michaels on cassette tape. He initially approached Murray Bowles, a long time scene veteran and photographer and Joel Wing, a local musician, who played in various East Bay bands such as Corrupted Morals and Dance Hall Crashers.

Track listing

Personnel
 Jesse Michaels - lead vocals
 Lint - guitar, backing vocals
 Matt McCall - bass, backing vocals
 Dave Mello - drums

Additional musicians
 Pat Mello - backing vocals

Production
 Tim Armstrong - producer
 Kevin Army - producer, engineer, mixing
 Brian Edge - recording
 Jesse Michaels - cover art
 Eric Yee - artwork

References

External links
 Plea for Peace EP @ Discogs.com

Operation Ivy (band) albums
1992 EPs
EPs published posthumously